Best of Tata Young is a 2006 greatest hits album by Thai pop singer Tata Young. It is a career-spanning, two-disc album, covering her years as a teen star at GMM Grammy (Amita Tata Young, 1,000,000 Copies Celebration, 6.2.12, Amazing Tata, O Negative, Red Bike Story), her switch to BEC-TERO (Tata Young, Real TT) and eventual signing to Sony BMG Music Entertainment (Dangerous Tata and her English language debut, I Believe). It was released ahead of her second English-language album, Temperature Rising.

Track listing

Disc one
โอ๊ะ..โอ๊ย / Oo-Oui (Amita Tata Young)
รบกวนมารักกัน / Rob-Guan-Ma-Rak-Gun (Amita Tata Young)
พรุ่งนี้...ไม่สาย / Proong-Nee-Mai-Sai (Amita Tata Young)
ฉันรักเธอ / Chun-Rak-Tur (1,000,000 Copies Celebration)
ไม่รักตัวเอง / Mai-Rak-Tua-Eng (Amita Tata Young)
ขอได้ไหม / Kor-Dai-Mai (Amita Tata Young)
ซักกะนิด / Sak-Ga-Nid (Amazing TATA)
ขอถามซักหน่อย / Kor-Tam-Sak-Noi  (Amazing TATA)
คนเดิมใจเดิม / Kon-Derm-Jai-Derm (Amazing TATA)
รักเธอได้ไหม / Rak-Tur-Dai-Mai (Amazing TATA)
แมลง / Ma-Laeng (Mos & Tata from Red Bike Story)
แค่เธอรักฉัน / Kae-Tur-Rak-Chun (O Negative)
คนแบบฉัน / Kon-Baab-Chun (6.2.12)

Disc  two
สองคนหนึ่งคืน / Song-Kho- Nueng-Kuen (Dangerous Tata - Special Edition)
Hey Ma Ma Say (Dangerous Tata)
ยอม / Completely (Dangerous Tata)
Dangerous Feat. Thaitanium (Dangerous Tata)
Dhoom Dhoom  (Dhoom)
Sexy, Naughty, Bitchy  (I Believe)
I Believe (I Believe)
Cinderella (I Believe)
I think Of You (I Believe)
ช๊อต /Shot (Tata Young)
A-Bo-De-Be (Tata Young)
จะเก็บเอาไว้ให้เธอผู้เดียว /Ja-Geb-AO-Wai-Hai-Tur-Poo-Diew (Plaitein soundtrack)
อยากเก็บเธอไว้ทั้งสองคน /I Need The Both Of You (Real TT)
อีกนิดนะ / Eik-Nid-Na (Real TT)
Super แฟน (Superman)  (Real TT)

External links
Tata Young Discography

Tata Young albums
2006 greatest hits albums